Royal Winter Music is the name given to two solo works for classical guitar by the German composer Hans Werner Henze.

Both works are inspired by characters from Shakespeare. The first work (described as a sonata) was completed in 1976, and is in six movements. The first part, Richard of Gloucester gives the overall work its name (from Richard's opening monologue Now is the winter of our discontent).

The first piece was premiered by Julian Bream (at whose request Henze had written it) in Berlin on 20 September 1976.

The second sonata, written in 1979, continues the Shakespearean theme in three parts. Henze has stated that the work as whole is now complete.

The second piece was premiered by Reinbert Evers in the Goethe-Institut, Brussels on 25 November 1980. Both works are dedicated by Julian Bream.

First Sonata on Shakespearean Characters
Gloucester
Romeo and Juliet
Ariel
Ophelia
Touchstone, Audrey and William
Oberon

Second Sonata on Shakespearean Characters
Sir Andrew Aguecheek (Junker Bleichenwang)
Bottom's Dream
Mad Lady Macbeth

Recordings

Otto Tolonen: Royal Winter Music (Alba Records, 2015)

References

Compositions by Hans Werner Henze
Compositions for guitar
1976 compositions
1979 compositions
Music based on works by William Shakespeare